The 0110 concerts, held on October 1, 2006 in Antwerp, Brussels, Charleroi and Ghent, were organised by dEUS frontman Tom Barman, Arno Hintjens and Frederik Sioen to promote tolerance in Belgian society, and "against Vlaams Belang, extremism and gratuitous violence".

According to the organisation, more than 100,000 people attended the concerts (around 50,000 in Antwerp, 25,000 in Ghent and Brussels, and 5,000 in Charleroi). Over 140 Belgian artists and groups, often in unprecedented combinations (like Daan and Plastic Bertrand, Gorki and Isabelle A, and so on), volunteered for the event. Tom Barman stated that this would not be a one-time initiative.

The concerts were sponsored by the Belgian National Lottery. Summer rock festivals like Sfinks, Pukkelpop, Folk Dranouter, Lokerse Feesten, Gentse Feesten and Suikerrock urged their public to support the event.

0110 controversy 
The event preceded the 2006 municipal elections in Belgium by just one week, thus sending a political message as well.

The right wing opposition party Vlaams Belang wrote an open letter to famous Flemish artists, such as Clouseau, Helmut Lotti, Will Tura, Johan Verminnen and Laura Lynn, who were announced to participate, asking not to do so. The party requested the boycott because the event "only targets Vlaams Belang". One Vlaams Belang council member has called upon the readers of his web log to start a "mail bombardment" to the concerned artists. Critics speak of an intimidation campaign by the party.
According to the Vlaams Belang however, the intimidation came from the organizers of the 0110 concerts and the complete Flemish media against Vlaams Belang, because the Flemish media were partizan of the concerts. According to the party, the media in Flanders is completely in the hands of the left-wing establishment. On the contrary, no Flemish artist would ever even think to participate in a festival organised by the Vlaams Belang, because this would be responded by the establishment by an ever-lasting boycott against the artist. On a party congress on 1 October, Filip Dewinter was quoted saying that "if it really were concerts against intolerance, the Vlaams Belang would have to be guest of honour", referring to the cordon sanitaire against the party.

Vlaams Belang sees this as a direct attack by the establishment, because the event is sponsored by the Belgian National Lottery. The National Lottery however decided upon the sponsoring contract before the political content was clear.

The Antwerp mayor Patrick Janssens (Different Socialist Party) disapproved of the concerts. The Vlaams Belang party also refers to the fact that the official website of the event specifically states that "Flanders deserves better than extreme right" and that Tom Barman, the main organizer, had already announced in 2005 that he was planning a concert "against Vlaams Belang" in October 2006.

The concerts

Antwerp
Presentation: Bart Peeters
Location: Vlaamse en Waalse Kaai (Gedempte Zuiderdokken)

 Abdel zonder gel
 Wannes Van de Velde / Fixkes
 Jan De Smet
 Leki
 Sindicato Sonico
 Zita Swoon + Guests
 Scala
 Douzi
 Roland & Boogie Boy
 Clouseau
 Internationals (the concert was cancelled due to bad weather conditions).
 dEUS
 Fixkes

https://web.archive.org/web/20140513011523/https://www.proximusgoformusic.be/nl/item.php?text_id=145438

Brussels
Presentation: Annabelle Van Nieuwenhuyse and Sam Touzani 
Location: Paleizenplein/place des Palais (in Dutch/French)

"De Laatste Showband" with guests:
 Bunny & Patrick Riguelle
 Ialma
 Ialma & Urban Trad & N'Faly Kouyaté
 Laura Lynn & David Bovée & Patrick
 Think of One & Marrakech Emballages Ensemble
 Guy Swinnen & Willy Willy & Sibo
 Willem Vermandere & Fabrizio Cassol
 La Fille d'Ernest & Willy Willy & Patrick
 Balo & Pili Ginga
 Johan Verminnen & Axl Peleman
 Manou Gallo & Laïla Amezian
 Jan Decorte Adamo & Mousta Largo
 Rey Cabrera & Jean-Louis Daulne
 Neeka & Philip Catherine & Patrick Riguelle
 A Brand
 Baï Kamara Jr. & Dani Klein
 Lange Jojo
 Sttellla & Lange Jojo
 Two Man Sound
 Laura Claycomb & Stijn
 James Deano & UMAN & JMX
 Rocco Granata & Roland
 Réjane & Patrick
 Frank Vander linden & Eté 67
 Monsoon & Sacha Toorop
 Jaune Toujours & Monsoon & Fabrizio Cassol
 Saule & Lio
 Marie Daulne & Fabrizio Cassol
 Viktor Lazlo & Daan
 Hooverphonic
 Laïs
 Axelle Red & Akro
 Plastic Bertrand
 Arno & Plastic Wallace Collection

Charleroi
Location: Spiroudome

 Super carolo Band
 Prïba 2000
 Jeff Bodart
 William Dunker/Aldo Granato
 Marka
 Abou Mehdi (1 slam)
 Hollywood Porn Star
 Malibu Stacy (Dave)
 My Little cheap Dictaphone
 Messbass 1 slam et 1 rap
 Vincent Venet
 Miam Monster Miam
 Sophie galet
 Marie Warnant
 KLM 1 slam et 1 rap
 Ete 67
 Jeronimo
 Montevideo
 front stage: Inox 1 slam 1 rap
 Machiavel
 Beverly jo Scott
 tbc
 front stage: Abou Mehdi 1 slam et 1 rap
 collectif dub reggae Ashanti 3000, Omar Perry, Mika
 KLM 1 slam et Messbass 1 rap
 Les pleureurs
 Saule
 Lio
 Sacha Toorop
 Adamo
 Abou Mehdi 1 slam et Inox 1 rap
 Super carolo
 Band Marka, Priba 2000
 William Dunker, Prïba 2000
 Sttellla (Jlfonck)+ Prïba 2000
 Super Carolo band full/FINAL
 DJ Globul/ Fabrice Lig

Ghent

Presentation: Wim Oosterlinck
Location: NMBS parking (St. Pietersstation)

 X!nk
 Monza (special guest Thé Lau)
 Gunter Lamoot
 Living Roots I (starring Bert Ostyn, Dirk Blanchart, Kris De Bruyne, Kommil Foo)
 Hadise
 Living Roots II (starring Jan De Campenaere, Gert Bettens, Djamel, PJDS)
 Abdelli
 't Hof van Commerce
 Wouter Deprez
 Luc De Vos + girlfriends (Isabelle A)
 Kamagurka
 Sioen
 Will Tura
 Arid
 Helmut Lotti

Book
In 2008 Belgian author Bart Van Lierde wrote the crime novel 0110: the premiss is a terrorist act during the 0110 concerts in Antwerp. The main question is which political party ordered the attack: Vlaams Belang, as this party is convinced that the concerts are held to influence the outcome of the municipal elections; or the other parties, as the outcome indeed may be influenced if Vlaams Belang will be found guilty.

Footnotes

External links
 0110 on Myspace

Culture in Brussels
Culture in Antwerp
Music festivals in Belgium
Society of Belgium
2006 concerts
Rock festivals in Belgium
Events in Ghent